Agua Prieta Municipality is a municipality in Sonora in north-western Mexico. As of 2015, the municipality had a total population of 82,918.

Localities 
 San Bernardino Lagunas

Adjacent municipalities and counties
 Janos Municipality, Chihuahua - east
 Bavispe Municipality - southeast
 Nacozari de García Municipality - south
 Fronteras Municipality - southwest
 Naco Municipality - west
 Cochise County, Arizona - northwest
 Hidalgo County, New Mexico - northeast

References

Municipalities of Sonora